The Muslim League was the original successor of the All-India Muslim League that led the Pakistan Movement to achieve an independent nation. Five of the country's Prime Ministers have been affiliated with this party, namely Liaquat Ali Khan, Khwaja Nazimuddin, M. A. Bogra, Chaudhry Muhammad Ali, and I. I. Chundrigar. The Muslim League was defeated in the 1955 elections to the Constituent Assembly by a political alliance known as the United Front. However, Prime Minister C. M. Ali and Prime Minister Chundrigar were appointed to lead a minority government. The party was dissolved in 1958 after the declaration of Martial Law by General Muhammad Ayub Khan, the Commander-in-Chief of Pakistan Army.

History

On the foundation of Pakistan, the President of the All-India Muslim League, Jinnah, became the new nation's Governor-General, and the secretary general of the Muslim League, Liaquat Ali Khan became Prime Minister. The All-India Muslim League was disbanded in December 1947 and succeeded by two organisations, the Muslim League and the Indian Union Muslim League, the first being its original successor in Pakistan.  Jinnah resigned as the president of the Muslim League on 17 December and the two Muslim Leagues respectively elected Ch. Khaliquzzaman as President of the Muslim League (Pakistan) and Muhammad Ismail as the president for Indian Union Muslim League.

Ideology
The party remained the chief governing party for the early years after the partition. Under the premiership of Liaquat Ali Khan, the ML government successfully drafted the Objectives Resolution. Although Khan was a progressive, he introduced constitutional reforms in line with religious values and principles. The party however adopted a conservative platform under Khwaja Nazimuddin. Nazimuddin opposed equal minority rights and thus, the party lost the support of much of the progressive elite. However, much of his policies were repealed by his successors like Bogra and Ali, who promoted all sorts of liberties and equalities.

The party's economic policies were pro-Capitalist. Prime Ministers like Khan and Bogra were keen supporters of a Western-style economy and promoted Economic liberalism and Fiscal conservatism. In the 1950s, Pakistan signed the pro-Capitalist pacts like CENTO and SEATO, quenching any possible chance of communist influence in the country. Despite Muslim League's support for Islam, the party did not take any action against the Usury payments, attracting criticism from religious parties.

End of party
Jinnah died in September 1948 and Liaquat was assassinated in October 1951. Robbed of its two senior leaders, the League began to disintegrate. By 1953, dissensions within the League had led to the formation of several different political parties. Liaquat was succeeded by Khawaja Nazimuddin, a Bengali, who was forced out of office in April 1953. Pakistan was racked by riots, and in the first national elections in May 1955 (held by a system of indirect voting) the League was heavily defeated.

In October 1958, the Army seized power and the martial law regime of Muhammad Ayub Khan banned all political parties. This was the end of the old Muslim League.

Other parties by the same name
The name still held great prestige, however, and Ayub Khan later formed a new party, the Convention Muslim League. The opposition faction became known as the Council Muslim League. This latter group joined a united front with other political parties in 1967 in opposition to the regime. But when the military regime of Agha Mohammad Yahya Khan fell in December 1971, and Pakistan's first genuine free elections were held but the military did not allow the majority winner to take office. Bhutto's PPP was swept out of power: West Pakistan dominated by the Pakistan Peoples Party of Zulfikar Ali Bhutto lost massively and the Awami League of East Pakistan heavily won the ballot 
under Sheikh Mujibur Rahman. However, a larger conspiracy did not allow Awami League to be sworn into power. War ensued and East Pakistan became  Peoples Republic of Bangladesh on 26 March 1971.

After 1971 in Pakistan (West) the PPP led by Zulfiqar Ali Bhutto took power. 1977 Bhutto was removed by General Ziaul Haq through a coup. 1988, after the death of Pakistan's military ruler and later civilian President Muhammad Zia-ul-Haq, a new Muslim League was formed under the leadership of Nawaz Sharif, but it had no connection with the original Muslim League. Sharif was Prime Minister from 1990 to 1993 and again from 1997 to 1999, when he was ousted in Pakistan's third military coup. At the controversial elections held by the military regime of Pervez Musharraf in October, five different parties using the name Muslim League contested seats. The largest of these, the Pakistan Muslim League (Quaid-e-Azam), won 69 seats out of 272, and the Pakistan Muslim League (Nawaz), loyal to Nawaz Sharif, won 19 seats. After the elections in 2008, Quaid-e-Azam league was in the ruling coalition and the Nawaz Sharif's Muslim League sat in opposition. In the recent 2013 elections Pakistan Muslim League (Nawaz) emerged as the largest party in the country; the party formed its government at the center and Nawaz Sharif was re elected for third term as Prime Minister of Pakistan.

Current factions of re founded party

 Pakistan Markazi Muslim League
 Pakistan Muslim League (N) (Nawaz)
 Pakistan Muslim League (Q) (Quaid-e-Azam Group)
 Pakistan Muslim League (F) (Functional)
 Pakistan Muslim League (Z) (Zia-ul-Haq Shaheed)
 Awami Muslim League
 All Pakistan Muslim League

References

Main
Main2
Defunct political parties in Pakistan
Political parties established in 1947
1947 establishments in Pakistan
Political parties disestablished in 1958
1958 disestablishments in Pakistan